Paltalu (also Romanized as Pāltalū; also known as Bāletlū) is a village in Qareh Poshtelu-e Bala Rural District, Qareh Poshtelu District, Zanjan County, Zanjan Province, Iran. At the 2006 census, its population was 90, in 26 families.

References 

Populated places in Zanjan County